Acatinga is a genus of beetles in the family Cerambycidae, containing the following species:

 Acatinga boucheri (Tavakilian & Peñaherrera-Leiva, 2005)
 Acatinga gallardi (Penaherrera-Leiva & Tavakilian, 2004)
 Acatinga maia (Newman, 1841)
 Acatinga quinquemaculata (Zajciw, 1966)

References

Rhinotragini